Alessandro Rossi (born 10 August 1967) was one of the two Captains Regent of San Marino for the six-month term from 1 April to 1 October 2007, together with Alessandro Mancini.

Rossi is a member of the United Left.

External links
Profile on the website of the Council of Europe

1967 births
Living people
People from Rimini
University of Bologna alumni
Captains Regent of San Marino
Members of the Grand and General Council
United Left (San Marino) politicians